John Callaghan may refer to:

John Callaghan (physician) (1923–2004), Canadian cardiac surgeon
John Callaghan (Galway), Irish murder victim
John Callaghan (musician) (born 1969), British musician
John Callaghan (screenwriter), see List of Republic of Doyle episodes
John Callaghan (footballer), see List of Sheffield Wednesday F.C. players

See also
John Callahan (disambiguation)
John O'Callaghan (disambiguation)